Hexophthalma is a genus of spiders in the family Sicariidae. Although the genus was originally erected in 1878 (then with the name Hexomma), it was merged into the genus Sicarius in the 1890s, and remained unused until revived in 2017, when it was discovered that the African species then placed in Sicarius were distinct. The English name six-eyed sand spiders is used for members of the genus, particularly Hexophthalma hahni. Species in the genus have necrotic (dermonecrotic) venom, and can potentially cause serious or even life-threatening wounds.

Taxonomy
The genus was first created in 1878 by Friedrich Karsch as Hexomma, with the sole species Hexomma hahni. By 1879, though, Karsch had realized that this name had already been used in 1877 for a species of harvestman, so he published the replacement name Hexophthalma. In 1893, Eugène Simon transferred Hexophthalma hahni to the genus Sicarius, and Hexophthalma fell out of use, until a phylogenetic study in 2017 showed that the African species of Sicarius, including Sicarius hahni, were distinct, and revived the genus Hexophthalma for them.

Hexophthalma is one of three genera in the family Sicariidae, . It is placed in the same subfamily, Sicariinae, as Sicarius:

Species
Two new species were added to the genus in 2018, and one previously accepted species, H. testacea, was synonymized with H. hahnii. The number of species is expected to increase with further study. H. spatulata differs in a number of respects from other species in the genus, which  thus may not be monophyletic.

, the World Spider Catalog accepted these extant species:
Hexophthalma albospinosa (Purcell, 1908) – Namibia, South Africa
Hexophthalma binfordae Lotz, 2018 – Namibia
Hexophthalma damarensis (Lawrence, 1928) – Namibia
Hexophthalma dolichocephala (Lawrence, 1928) – Namibia
Hexophthalma goanikontesensis Lotz, 2018 – Namibia
Hexophthalma hahni (Karsch, 1878) (type species) – Namibia, South Africa
Hexophthalma leroyi Lotz, 2018 – South Africa
Hexophthalma spatulata (Pocock, 1900) – South Africa

Venom
Species of Hexophthalma produce venom that can have necrotic (dermonecrotic) effects, capable of causing serious or even life-threatening wounds, particularly if the wound becomes infected or the venom spreads in the body. The necrotic effects are caused by a family of proteins related to sphingomyelinase D, present in the venom of all sicariid spiders. In this respect, the genus resembles Loxosceles, the recluse spiders. However, most Hexophthalama species have only been studied in vitro, and the detailed effects of their venom in humans and other vertebrates are unknown. One case was officially confirmed in South America in 1992, in a 17-year-old who developed a dermonecrotic lesion. There are two suspected cases in Africa, for which the spider has not been identified; however, according to the victim's description, the culprit could be Hexophthalma spatulata. One of the two victims lost his arm due to extensive tissue necrosis.

References

External links
 – includes southern African Sicarius, now Hexophthalma

Sicariidae
Araneomorphae genera